On November 8, 2022, Washington, D.C., held an election for its mayor. Incumbent Democrat Muriel Bowser was elected to a third term. The Republican nominee, Stacia Hall, received 2,368 votes in the primary, and independent candidate Rodney "Red" Grant garnered 4,700 signatures to gain ballot access. Both appeared on the general election ballot along with Libertarian Party candidate Dennis Sobin. D.C. Statehood Green Party nominee Corren Brown did not appear on the general election ballot.

Democratic primary
Incumbent Attorney General Karl Racine was considered to be the most likely Democrat to challenge Muriel Bowser. Though Racine filed to seek reelection as Attorney General, in October 2021 he announced he would not be running for any office in 2022. The following day, Councilmember Robert White, a former aide to Racine, announced his campaign. White was joined by several other candidates later on, the most notable of whom was Councilmember Trayon White, who announced his campaign in a comment on Instagram. On April 4, 2022, Robert White's campaign announced a challenge to Trayon White's ballot access signatures. Robert White's camp argued that up to 2,800 of Trayon White's signatures might be invalid. While many of Trayon White's signatures were invalidated by the Board of Elections, they certified 2,138 signatures, just 138 over the minimum required, ensuring Trayon White will appear on the ballot.

Candidates

Declared 
 Muriel Bowser, incumbent (since 2015)

Eliminated in primary 
  James Butler, Advisory Neighborhood Commissioner in Ward 5 and candidate for Mayor in 2018
 Robert White, at-large Council member (since 2016)
 Trayon White, Ward 8 Council member (since 2017)

Failed to qualify for ballot access
 Michael Campbell, pastor and Chapter President of DC National Action Network
 Andre Delontae Davis, teacher

Declined
 Karl Racine, Attorney General for the District of Columbia (since 2015)

Endorsements

Polling
Graphical summary

Results

Republican primary

Candidates

Declared 
 Stacia Hall

Results

Statehood Green primary

Candidates

Declared
 Corren Brown

Independents

Candidates

Qualified for ballot access 
 Rodney "Red" Grant, entertainment executive, philanthropist, and humanitarian

Declined 
 David Grosso, at-large Councilor (2013–2021)
 Karl Racine, Attorney General for the District of Columbia (since 2015)

General election

Results

Notes

Partisan clients

References

See also 

 2022 Council of the District of Columbia election

External links
Official campaign websites 
 Muriel Bowser (D) for Mayor
 Corren Brown (SG) for Mayor
 James Butler (D) for Mayor
 Michael Campbell (D) for Mayor
 Dustin "DC" Canter (I) for Mayor
 Andre Davis (D) for Mayor
 Rodney "Red" Grant (I) for Mayor
 Stacia Hall (R) for Mayor
 Robert White (D) for Mayor

2022
Mayoral
Washington